Parornix retrusella is a moth of the family Gracillariidae. It is known from the Russian Far East.

The larvae feed on Crataegus pinnatifida. They probably mine the leaves of their host plant.

References

Parornix
Moths of Asia
Moths described in 1979